Byeon Chang-heum (born 14 August 1964) is a South Korean educator who served as the chief executive officer (CEO) of the Korea Land and Housing Corporation from April 2019 to December 2020. On 4 December 2020, he was nominated the new Minister of Land, Infrastructure and Transport, replacing the incumbent Kim Hyun-mee.

Career

Early career 
Following the graduation, Byeon worked as a lecturer at Chungbuk National University, Kangnam University, Yonsei University and Seoul National University. Serving as the senior researcher at Seoul City Development Corporation (now Seoul Housing and Communities Corporation) from 1996 to 1999, he became the Professor of the Public Administration Department of Sejong University in 2003. In 2014, he served as the Head of the Korea Centre for City and Environment Research.

In November 2014, Byeon was appointed the CEO of the SH Corporation, under the then Mayor of Seoul Park Won-soon. The appointment had gained public attentions, as he was the first scholar to hold the position. Under his tenure, the corporation changed its name to Seoul Housing and Communities Corporation in 2016. Despite of his reform, he resigned in November 2017 due to blacklist controversy.

His tenure as the chief executive officer (CEO) of the Korea Land and Housing Corporation began on 29 April 2019. He backed and fulfilled the housing policies of the Moon Jae-in government. When he attended the Land, Infrastructure and Transport Committee of the National Assembly on 3 August 2020, he was asked by the Icheon MP Song Seog-jun about (among Lee Myung-bak, Park Geun-hye and Moon Jae-in) which government's real estate policy was the best. Byeon replied that Moon's policy is the best.

On 4 December 2020, he was nominated the new Minister of Land, Infrastructure and Transport, replacing the incumbent Kim Hyun-mee. As he became a minister-nominee, he resigned as the CEO of the Korea Land and Housing Corporation on 14 December. Several netizens denounced his appointment as "similar" or "spicier" than the incumbent.

On 12 March 2021, Byeon offered to tender his resignation to the President Moon Jae-in. He left the office on 16 April. His term was only 109 days, making him as the shortest-serving Minister of Land, Infrastructure and Transport.

Controversies 
On 18 December 2020, the office of Park Seong-min, a People Power MP, revealed that Byeon had already made a defamatory remark against share house residents while he was the CEO of the SH Corporation on 30 June 2016. The remark was "Those poor people should cook at their home, not buying outside foods. It's absolutely crazy."; where the "poor people" refers to "share house residents". A day before, Park's office also revealed that Byeon had already made another remark against a victim of Guui station incident; saying "It was just nothing. The victim had to be careful."

Personal life and education 
After the graduation from Neungin High School, Byeon attended Seoul National University, where he obtained a bachelor's degree in economics, a master's degree in urban planning and a doctorate in public administration.

In 1992, he married Park Jong-hyo, a professor at Konkuk University. They have two daughters — Byeon Ye-seul and Byeon Hyun-jung.

He is a Buddhist.

References 

1964 births
Living people
South Korean educators
Government ministers of South Korea